The City of Holdfast Bay is a local government area in the south-western coastal suburbs of Adelaide, South Australia.

History
The council was formed 1 January 1997, when the City of Glenelg and City of Brighton councils were amalgamated by the state government. As a result, there are two council offices, one in the historic Glenelg Library on Colley Terrace and the other on Jetty Road, Brighton.

Council

The current council  is:

Mayors

The Council has had 4 mayors: Brian Nadilo (1997-2006), Ken Rollond (2006-2014), Stephen Patterson (2014-2017) and Amanda Wilson (2018-).

Suburbs
 Brighton (5048)
 Glenelg (5045)
 Glenelg East (5045)
 Glenelg North (5045)
 Glenelg South (5045)
 Hove (5048)
 Kingston Park (5049)
 North Brighton (5048)
 Seacliff (5049)
 Seacliff Park (5049)
 Somerton Park (5044)
 South Brighton (5048)

Wards

The council consists of four Wards: Glenelg, Somerton, Brighton and Seacliff. Each Ward is represented by three Ward Councillors.

Sister city

There is one Sister city to Holdfast Bay.

  Hayama, Kanagawa, Japan

See also
 List of Adelaide parks and gardens

References

External links

City of Holdfast Bay community profile

Local government areas of South Australia
Local government areas in Adelaide